Deaf Wrestlefest is a professional wrestling supercard, produced annually in late April or early May by Lord Zoltan, a longtime wrestler and sports promoter based in Western Pennsylvania. It is considered a major fundraiser for the Western Pennsylvania School for the Deaf and has raised, on average, between $3,000 and $4,000 per show. Proceeds from the event benefit Pennsylvania school programs to educate Deaf students.

The event was first produced in 1994, originally as part of the Steel City Wrestling promotion, and produced six editions until the promotion closed in 2000, and two more independently. The school, according to Zoltan, then decided to discontinue the event due to the increasing violence and adult content associated with professional wrestling during the late-1990s. Two of his sons, both Deaf, attended the school during this period. Following a seven-year hiatus, it was revived for the school's 140th anniversary in 2009; the highlight of the show was J. J. Dillon who, in his first in-ring appearance since 1989, teamed with "Beef Stew" Lou Marconi and "Handsome" Frank Staletto in a six-man tag team match against "Franchise" Shane Douglas, Dominic Denucci and Cody Michaels.

The event is a staple on the East Coast and Mid-Atlantic independent circuit. Unlike standard wrestling events, however, an interpreter is provided to sign for the students during promos and for other parts of the show. Among the promotions represented at the event are the International Wrestling Cartel, Keystone State Wrestling Alliance, National Wrestling Alliance and UCW Wrestling; the arrival of the North Carolina-based G.O.U.G.E. Wrestling at the 2010 Deaf Wrestlefest marked the organization's debut in Pennsylvania. The event has featured a number of stars from Extreme Championship Wrestling, World Championship Wrestling, and World Wrestling Entertainment.

Show results

Deaf Wrestlefest (1994)
1994 in Edgewood, Pennsylvania (Western Pennsylvania School for the Deaf)

Deaf Wrestlefest (1995)
April 9, 1995 in Edgewood, Pennsylvania (Western Pennsylvania School for the Deaf)

Deaf Wrestlefest (1996)
April 21, 1996 in Edgewood, Pennsylvania (Western Pennsylvania School for the Deaf)

Deaf Wrestlefest (1997)
April 22, 1997 in Edgewood, Pennsylvania (Western Pennsylvania School for the Deaf)

Vince Kaplack vs. Barry Kohlhoff ended in a draw.

Deaf Wrestlefest (1998)
April 26, 1998 in Edgewood, Pennsylvania (Western Pennsylvania School for the Deaf)

BombSquad defeated Dennis Gregory & Barry Kohlhoff.

Deaf Wrestlefest (1999)
April 18, 1999 in Edgewood, Pennsylvania (Western Pennsylvania School for the Deaf)

Deaf Wrestlefest Y2K (2000)
April 12, 2000 in Edgewood, Pennsylvania (Western Pennsylvania School for the Deaf)

Deaf Wrestlefest 2K1 (2001)
April 29, 2001 in Edgewood, Pennsylvania (Western Pennsylvania School for the Deaf)

Deaf Wrestlefest 2K2 (2002)
April 21, 2002 in Edgewood, Pennsylvania (Western Pennsylvania School for the Deaf)

Deaf Wrestlefest (2009)
May 3, 2009 in Edgewood, Pennsylvania (Western Pennsylvania School for the Deaf)

Deaf Wrestlefest (2010)
May 2, 2010 in Edgewood, Pennsylvania (Western Pennsylvania School for the Deaf)

Deaf Wrestlefest (2011)
May 1, 2011 in Edgewood, Pennsylvania (Western Pennsylvania School for the Deaf)

Deaf Wrestlefest (2012)
April 29, 2012 in Edgewood, Pennsylvania (Western Pennsylvania School for the Deaf)

References

External links

Professional wrestling shows
Professional wrestling in Pennsylvania
Festivals established in 2005